A Virtue is a trait of excellence that may be moral or intellectual.  The cultivation and refinement of virtue is held to be the "good of humanity" and thus is valued as an end purpose of life or foundational principle of being. In human practical ethics, a virtue is a disposition to choose words and actions that are successful by showing high moral standards: doing what is right and avoiding what is wrong in a given field of endeavour.  By taking pleasure in doing what is right, even when it is difficult or initially unpleasant, virtue becomes habitual.  Such a person is said to be Virtuous through having cultivated the disposition.  The opposite of virtue is vice, and the vicious person takes pleasure in habitual wrong-doing until it destroys him or her.

Other examples of this notion include the concept of merit in Asian traditions as well as De (Chinese 德). Buddhism's four brahmavihara ("Divine States") can be regarded as virtues in the European sense.

Etymology
The ancient Romans used the Latin word virtus (derived from vir, their word for man) to refer to all of the "excellent qualities of men, including physical strength, valorous conduct, and moral rectitude". The French words vertu and virtu came from this Latin root. The word virtue "was borrowed into English in the 13th century".

Ancient Egypt

Maat (or Ma'at) was the ancient Egyptian goddess of truth, balance, order, law, morality, and justice. The word maat was also used to refer to these concepts. Maat was also portrayed as regulating the stars, seasons, and the actions of both mortals and the deities. The deities set the order of the universe from chaos at the moment of creation. Her (ideological) counterpart was Isfet, who symbolized chaos, lies, and injustice.

Greco-Roman antiquity

Platonic virtue
The four classic cardinal virtues are:
 Prudence (phrónēsis; ; also Wisdom, Sophia, sapientia), the ability to discern the appropriate course of action to be taken in a given situation at the appropriate time.
 Fortitude (andreía): also termed courage, forbearance, strength, endurance, and the ability to confront fear, uncertainty, and intimidation.
 Temperance (sōphrosýnē): also known as restraint, the practice of self-control, abstention, discretion, and moderation tempering the appetition. Plato considered Sōphrosynē, which may also be translated as sound-mindedness, to be the most important virtue.
 Justice (dikaiosýnē): also considered as fairness; the Greek word also having the meaning righteousness.

This enumeration is traced to Greek philosophy and was listed by Plato in addition to piety:  (hosiotēs), with the exception that wisdom replaced prudence as virtue. Some scholars consider either of the above four virtue combinations as mutually reducible and therefore not cardinal.

It is unclear whether multiple virtues were of later construct, and whether Plato subscribed to a unified view of virtues. In Protagoras and Meno, for example, he states that the separate virtues cannot exist independently and offers as evidence the contradictions of acting with wisdom, yet in an unjust way; or acting with bravery (fortitude), yet without wisdom.

Aristotelian virtue 

In his work Nicomachean Ethics, Aristotle defined a virtue as a point between a deficiency and an excess of a trait. The point of greatest virtue lies not in the exact middle, but at a golden mean sometimes closer to one extreme than the other. However, the virtuous action is not simply the "mean" (mathematically speaking) between two opposite extremes. As Aristotle says in the Nicomachean Ethics: "at the right times, about the right things, towards the right people, for the right end, and in the right way, is the intermediate and best condition, and this is proper to virtue." This is not simply splitting the difference between two extremes. For example, generosity is a virtue between the two extremes of miserliness and being profligate. Further examples include: courage between cowardice and foolhardiness, and confidence between self-deprecation and vanity. In Aristotle's sense, virtue is excellence at being human.

Intellectual virtues 
Aristotle also identifies "intellectual virtues" naming two in particular:  art and science.

Roman Virtues
The term virtue itself is derived from the Latin "virtus" (the personification of which was the deity Virtus), and had connotations of "manliness", "honour", worthiness of deferential respect, and civic duty as both citizen and soldier. This virtue was but one of many virtues which Romans of good character were expected to exemplify and pass on through the generations, as part of the mos maiorum; ancestral traditions which defined "Roman-ness". Romans distinguished between the spheres of private and public life, and thus, virtues were also divided between those considered to be in the realm of private family life (as lived and taught by the paterfamilias), and those expected of an upstanding Roman citizen.

Most Roman concepts of virtue were also personified as a numinous deity. The primary Roman virtues, both public and private, were:

Ancient India

Valluvar

While religious scriptures generally consider dharma or aṟam (the Tamil term for virtue) as a divine virtue, Valluvar describes it as a way of life rather than any spiritual observance, a way of harmonious living that leads to universal happiness. For this reason, Valluvar keeps aṟam as the cornerstone throughout the writing of the Kural literature. Valluvar considered justice as a facet or product of aram. While many before his time opined that justice cannot be defined and that it was a divine mystery, Valluvar positively suggested that a divine origin is not required to define the concept of justice. In the words of V. R. Nedunchezhiyan, justice according to Valluvar "dwells in the minds of those who have knowledge of the standard of right and wrong; so too deceit dwells in the minds which breed fraud."

Chivalric virtues in medieval Europe

In the 8th century, upon the occasion of his coronation as Holy Roman Emperor, Charlemagne published a list of knightly virtues:
 Love God
 Love your neighbor
 Give alms to the poor
 Entertain strangers
 Visit the sick
 Be merciful to prisoners
 Do ill to no man, nor consent unto such
 Forgive as ye hope to be forgiven
 Redeem the captive
 Help the oppressed
 Defend the cause of the widow and orphan
 Render righteous judgement
 Do not consent to any wrong
 Persevere not in wrath
 Shun excess in eating and drinking
 Be humble and kind
 Serve your liege lord faithfully
 Do not steal
 Do not perjure yourself, nor let others do so
 Envy, hatred and violence separate men from the Kingdom of God
 Defend the Church and promote her cause.

Religious traditions

Abrahamic religions

Bahá'í Faith

The Baháʼí teachings speak of a "Greater Covenant", being universal and endless, and a "Lesser Covenant", being unique to each religious dispensation. At this time Baháʼís view Baháʼu'lláh's revelation as a binding lesser covenant for his followers; in the Baháʼí writings being firm in the covenant is considered a virtue to work toward.

Christianity

In Christianity, the three theological virtues are faith, hope and love, a list which comes from 1 Corinthians 13:13 ( pistis (faith),  elpis (hope),  agape (love)). The same chapter describes love as the greatest of the three, and further defines love as "patient, kind, not envious, boastful, arrogant, or rude." (The Christian virtue of love is sometimes called charity and at other times a Greek word agape is used to contrast the love of God and the love of humankind from other types of love such as friendship or physical affection.)

Christian scholars frequently add the four classic cardinal virtues (prudence, justice, temperance, and courage) to the theological virtues to give the seven heavenly virtues; for example, these seven are the ones described in the Catechism of the Catholic Church, sections 1803–1829.

The Bible mentions additional virtues, such as in the "Fruit of the Holy Spirit," found in Galatians 5:22–23: "By contrast, the fruit of the Spirit it is benevolent-love: joy, peace, longsuffering, kindness, benevolence, faithfulness, gentleness, and self-control. There is absolutely no law against such a thing."

In 410 CE, Aurelius Prudentius Clemens listed seven "heavenly virtues" in his book Psychomachia (Battle of Souls) which is an allegorical story of conflict between vices and virtues. These virtues (later called the seven capital virtues) depicted were:

 Chastity
 Temperance
 Charity
 Diligence
 Patience
 Kindness
 Humility.

The medieval and renaissance periods saw a number of models of sin listing the seven deadly sins and the seven capital virtues opposed to each.

Islam

In Islam, the Quran is believed to be the literal word of God, and the definitive description of virtue while Muhammad is considered an ideal example of virtue in human form. The foundation of Islamic understanding of virtue was the understanding and interpretation of the Quran and the practices of Muhammad. Its meaning has always been in context of active submission to God performed by the community in unison. The motive force is the notion that believers are to "enjoin that which is virtuous and forbid that which is vicious" (al-amr bi-l-maʿrūf wa-n-nahy ʿani-l-munkar) in all spheres of life (Quran 3:110). Another key factor is the belief that mankind has been granted the faculty to discern God's will and to abide by it. This faculty most crucially involves reflecting over the meaning of existence. Therefore, regardless of their environment, humans are believed to have a moral responsibility to submit to God's will. Muhammad's preaching produced a "radical change in moral values based on the sanctions of the new religion and the present religion, and fear of God and of the Last Judgment". Later Muslim scholars expanded the religious ethics of the scriptures in immense detail.

In the Hadith (Islamic traditions), it is reported by An-Nawwas bin Sam'an:

Wabisah bin Ma’bad reported:

Virtue, as seen in opposition to sin, is termed thawāb (spiritual merit or reward) but there are other Islamic terms to describe virtue such as faḍl ("bounty"), taqwa ("piety") and ṣalāḥ ("righteousness"). For Muslims fulfilling the rights of others are valued as an important building block of Islam. According to Muslim beliefs, God will forgive individual sins but the bad treatment of people and injustice with others will only be pardoned by them and not by God.

Judaism

Loving God and obeying his laws, in particular the Ten Commandments, are central to Jewish conceptions of virtue. Wisdom is personified in the first eight chapters of the Book of Proverbs and is not only the source of virtue but is depicted as the first and best creation of God (Proverbs 8:12–31).

A classic articulation of the Golden Rule came from the first century Rabbi Hillel the Elder. Renowned in the Jewish tradition as a sage and a scholar, he is associated with the development of the Mishnah and the Talmud and, as such, one of the most important figures in Jewish history. Asked for a summary of the Jewish religion in the most concise terms, Hillel replied (reputedly while standing on one leg): "That which is hateful to you, do not do to your fellow. That is the whole Torah. The rest is commentary; go and learn."

Eastern religions

Buddhism

Buddhist practice as outlined in the Noble Eightfold Path can be regarded as a progressive list of virtues.
 Right View – Realizing the Four Noble Truths (samyag-vyāyāma, sammā-vāyāma).
 Right Mindfulness – Mental ability to see things for what they are with clear consciousness (samyak-smṛti, sammā-sati).
 Right Concentration – Wholesome one-pointedness of mind (samyak-samādhi, sammā-samādhi).

Buddhism's four brahmavihara ("Divine States") can be more properly regarded as virtues in the European sense. They are:
 Metta/Maitri: loving-kindness towards all; the hope that a person will be well; loving kindness is the wish that all sentient beings, without any exception, be happy.
 Karuṇā: compassion; the hope that a person's sufferings will diminish; compassion is the wish for all sentient beings to be free from suffering.
 Mudita: altruistic joy in the accomplishments of a person, oneself or other; sympathetic joy is the wholesome attitude of rejoicing in the happiness and virtues of all sentient beings.
 Upekkha/Upeksha: equanimity, or learning to accept both loss and gain, praise and blame, success and failure with detachment, equally, for oneself and for others. Equanimity means not to distinguish between friend, enemy or stranger, but to regard every sentient being as equal. It is a clear-minded tranquil state of mind – not being overpowered by delusions, mental dullness or agitation.

There are also the Paramitas ("perfections"), which are the culmination of having acquired certain virtues. In Theravada Buddhism's canonical Buddhavamsa there are Ten Perfections (dasa pāramiyo). In Mahayana Buddhism, the Lotus Sutra (Saddharmapundarika), there are Six Perfections; while in the Ten Stages (Dasabhumika) Sutra, four more Paramitas are listed.

Daoism

"Virtue", translated from Chinese de (德), is also an important concept in Chinese philosophy, particularly Daoism. De originally meant normative "virtue" in the sense of "personal character; inner strength; integrity", but semantically changed to moral "virtue; kindness; morality". Note the semantic parallel for English virtue, with an archaic meaning of "inner potency; divine power" (as in "by virtue of") and a modern one of "moral excellence; goodness".

In early periods of Confucianism, moral manifestations of "virtue" include ren ("humanity"), xiao ("filial piety"), and li ("proper behavior, performance of rituals"). The notion of ren – according to Simon Leys – means "humanity" and "goodness". Ren originally had the archaic meaning in the Confucian Book of Poems of "virility", but progressively took on shades of ethical meaning. Some scholars consider the virtues identified in early Confucianism as non-theistic philosophy.

The Daoist concept of De, compared to Confucianism, is more subtle, pertaining to the "virtue" or ability that an individual realizes by following the Dao ("the Way"). One important normative value in much of Chinese thinking is that one's social status should result from the amount of virtue that one demonstrates, rather than from one's birth. In the Analects, Confucius explains de as follows: "He who exercises government by means of his virtue may be compared to the north polar star, which keeps its place and all the stars turn towards it." In later periods, particularly from the Tang dynasty period, Confucianism as practiced, absorbed and melded its own concepts of virtues with those from Daoism and Buddhism.

There are symbols that represent virtue in Chinese Culture. Chinese classic paintings have many symbolic meaning representing virtue. Plum Blossom represents resilience and perseverance. Orchid represents elegance, gentleness and quietness. Bamboo represents loyalty, trust-worthiness and humility. chrysanthemum represents genuineness and simplicity.

Hinduism
Virtue is a much debated and an evolving concept in ancient scriptures of Hinduism. The essence, need and value of virtue is explained in Hindu philosophy as something that cannot be imposed, but something that is realized and voluntarily lived up to by each individual. For example, Apastamba explained it thus: "virtue and vice do not go about saying – here we are!; neither the Gods, Gandharvas, nor ancestors can convince us – this is right, this is wrong; virtue is an elusive concept, it demands careful and sustained reflection by every man and woman before it can become part of one's life.

Virtues lead to punya (Sanskrit: पुण्य, holy living) in Hindu literature; while vices lead to pap (Sanskrit: पाप, sin). Sometimes, the word punya is used interchangeably with virtue.

The virtues that constitute a dharmic life – that is a moral, ethical, virtuous life – evolve in vedas and upanishads. Over time, new virtues were conceptualized and added by ancient Hindu scholars, some replaced, others merged. For example, Manusamhita initially listed ten virtues necessary for a human being to live a dharmic life: Dhriti (courage), Kshama (patience and forgiveness), Dama (temperance), Asteya (Non-covetousness/Non-stealing), Saucha (inner purity), Indriyani-graha (control of senses), dhi (reflective prudence), vidya (wisdom), satyam (truthfulness), akrodha (freedom from anger). In later verses, this list was reduced to five virtues by the same scholar, by merging and creating a broader concept. The shorter list of virtues became: Ahimsa (Non-violence), Dama (self restraint), Asteya (Non-covetousness/Non-stealing), Saucha (inner purity), Satyam (truthfulness).

The Bhagavad Gita – considered one of the epitomes of historic Hindu discussion of virtues and an allegorical debate on what is right and what is wrong – argues some virtues are not necessarily always absolute, but sometimes relational; for example, it explains a virtue such as Ahimsa must be re-examined when one is faced with war or violence from the aggressiveness, immaturity or ignorance of others.

Jainism

In Jainism, attainment of enlightenment is possible only if the seeker possesses certain virtues. All Jains are supposed to take up the five vows of ahimsa (non violence), satya (truthfulness), asteya (non stealing), aparigraha (non attachment) and brahmacharya (celibacy) before becoming a monk. These vows are laid down by the Tirthankaras. Other virtues which are supposed to be followed by both monks as well as laypersons include forgiveness, humility, self-restraint and straightforwardness. These vows assists the seeker to escape from the karmic bondages thereby escaping the cycle of birth and death to attain liberation.

Sikhism

Sikh ethics emphasize the congruence between spiritual development and everyday moral conduct. Its founder Guru Nanak summarized this perspective:Truth is the highest virtue, but higher still is truthful living.The Five Virtues of Sikhism are Sat (truth), Daya (compassion), Santokh (contentment), Nimrata (humility), and Pyaar (love).

Modern philosophers' views

René Descartes
For the Rationalist philosopher René Descartes, virtue consists in the correct reasoning that should guide our actions. Men should seek the sovereign good that Descartes, following Zeno, identifies with virtue, as this produces a solid blessedness or pleasure. For Epicurus the sovereign good was pleasure, and Descartes says that in fact this is not in contradiction with Zeno's teaching, because virtue produces a spiritual pleasure, that is better than bodily pleasure. Regarding Aristotle's opinion that happiness depends on the goods of fortune, Descartes does not deny that these goods contribute to happiness, but remarks that they are in great proportion outside one's own control, whereas one's mind is under one's complete control.

Immanuel Kant

Immanuel Kant, in his Observations on the Feeling of the Beautiful and Sublime, expresses true virtue as different from what commonly is known about this moral trait. In Kant's view, to be goodhearted, benevolent and sympathetic is not regarded as true virtue. The only aspect that makes a human truly virtuous is to behave in accordance with moral principles. Kant presents an example for more clarification; suppose that you come across a needy person in the street; if your sympathy leads you to help that person, your response does not illustrate your virtue. In this example, since you do not afford helping all needy ones, you have behaved unjustly, and it is out of the domain of principles and true virtue. Kant applies the approach of four temperaments to distinguish truly virtuous people. According to Kant, among all people with diverse temperaments, a person with melancholy frame of mind is the most virtuous whose thoughts, words and deeds are one of principles.

Friedrich Nietzsche 
Friedrich Nietzsche's view of virtue is based on the idea of an order of rank among people. For Nietzsche, the virtues of the strong are seen as vices by the weak and slavish, thus Nietzsche's virtue ethics is based on his distinction between master morality and slave morality. Nietzsche promotes the virtues of those he calls "higher men", people like Goethe and Beethoven. The virtues he praises in them are their creative powers (“the men of great creativity” – “the really great men according to my understanding” (WP 957)).
According to Nietzsche these higher types are solitary, pursue a "unifying project", revere themselves and are healthy and life-affirming. Because mixing with the herd makes one base, the higher type “strives instinctively for a citadel and a secrecy where he is saved from the crowd, the many, the great majority…” (BGE 26). The 'Higher type' also "instinctively seeks heavy responsibilities" (WP 944) in the form of an "organizing idea" for their life, which drives them to artistic and creative work and gives them psychological health and strength. The fact that the higher types are "healthy" for Nietzsche does not refer to physical health as much as a psychological resilience and fortitude. Finally, a Higher type affirms life because he is willing to accept the eternal return of his life and affirm this forever and unconditionally.

In the last section of Beyond Good and Evil, Nietzsche outlines his thoughts on the noble virtues and places solitude as one of the highest virtues:

And to keep control over your four virtues: courage, insight, sympathy, solitude. Because solitude is a virtue for us, since it is a sublime inclination and impulse to cleanliness which shows that contact between people (“society”) inevitably makes things unclean. Somewhere, sometime, every
community makes people – “base.” (BGE §284)

Nietzsche also sees truthfulness as a virtue:

Genuine honesty, assuming that this is our virtue and we cannot get rid of it, we free spirits – well then, we will want to work on it with all the love and malice at our disposal and not get tired of ‘perfecting’ ourselves in our virtue, the only one we have left: may its glory come to rest like a gilded, blue evening glow of mockery over this aging culture and its dull and dismal seriousness! (Beyond Good and Evil, §227)

Benjamin Franklin 

These are the virtues that Benjamin Franklin used to develop what he called 'moral perfection'. He had a checklist in a notebook to measure each day how he lived up to his virtues.

They became known through Benjamin Franklin's autobiography.

 Temperance: Eat not to Dullness. Drink not to Elevation.
 Silence: Speak not but what may benefit others or yourself. Avoid trifling Conversation.
 Order: Let all your Things have their Places. Let each Part of your Business have its Time.
 Resolution: Resolve to perform what you ought. Perform without fail what you resolve.
 Frugality: Make no Expense but to do good to others or yourself; i.e. Waste nothing.
 Industry: Lose no Time. Be always employed in something useful. Cut off all unnecessary Actions.
 Sincerity: Use no hurtful Deceit. Think innocently and justly; and, if you speak, speak accordingly.
 Justice: Wrong none, by doing Injuries or omitting the Benefits that are your Duty.
 Moderation: Avoid Extremes. Forbear resenting Injuries so much as you think they deserve.
 Cleanliness: Tolerate no Uncleanness in Body, Clothes or Habitation.
 Tranquility: Be not disturbed at Trifles, or at Accidents common or unavoidable.
 Chastity: Rarely use Venery but for Health or Offspring; Never to Dullness, Weakness, or the Injury of your own or another's Peace or Reputation.
 Humility: Imitate Jesus and Socrates.

Contemporary views

Virtues as emotions

Marc Jackson in his book Emotion and Psyche puts forward a new development of the virtues. He identifies the virtues as what he calls the good emotions "The first group consisting of love, kindness, joy, faith, awe and pity is good" These virtues differ from older accounts of the virtues because they are not character traits expressed by action, but emotions that are to be felt and developed by feeling not acting.

In the Taoist traditions, emotions have been used as the excessive or deficient branch of its root virtue, through the study of the Wuxing (five elements). It has been said, Correct Actions lead to virtues intention, as Virtuous intentions lead to Correct Actions.

Immanuel Kant, in his Observations on the Feeling of the Beautiful and Sublime, predicts and replies to Marc Johnson's view of emotions as virtues. To be goodhearted, benevolent and sympathetic is not regarded as true virtue, for one acts merely episodically, motivated by appeasing those naturally limited feelings, such as in the presence, for example, of a needy person in the street: in such a case, we do not act for a universal motive but simply as a response to end with a particular, individual, personal distress raised on us by our own sentiments.

In modern psychology
Christopher Peterson and Martin Seligman, two leading researchers in positive psychology, recognizing the deficiency inherent in psychology's tendency to focus on dysfunction rather than on what makes a healthy and stable personality, set out to develop a list of "Character Strengths and Virtues". After three years of study, 24 traits (classified into six broad areas of virtue) were identified, having "a surprising amount of similarity across cultures and strongly indicat[ing] a historical and cross-cultural convergence." These six categories of virtue are courage, justice, humanity, temperance, transcendence, and wisdom. Some psychologists suggest that these virtues are adequately grouped into fewer categories; for example, the same 24 traits have been grouped into simply: Cognitive Strengths, Temperance Strengths, and Social Strengths.

Vice as opposite

The opposite of a virtue is a vice. Vice is a habitual, repeated practice of wrongdoing. One way of organizing the vices is as the corruption of the virtues.

As Aristotle noted, however, the virtues can have several opposites. Virtues can be considered the mean between two extremes, as the Latin maxim dictates in medio stat virtus – in the centre lies virtue. For instance, both cowardice and rashness are opposites of courage; contrary to prudence are both over-caution and insufficient caution; the opposites of pride (a virtue) are undue humility and excessive vanity. A more "modern" virtue, tolerance, can be considered the mean between the two extremes of narrow-mindedness on the one hand and over-acceptance on the other. Vices can therefore be identified as the opposites of virtues – but with the caveat that each virtue could have many different opposites, all distinct from each other.

Within the Chinese Wuxing philosophy and Traditional Chinese Medicine vice and virture are expressed as excess or deficiency.

See also

 Bushido
 Civic virtue
 Common good
 Consequentialism
 Defence mechanism#Level 4: mature
 Epistemic virtue
 Evolution of morality
 Foresight (psychology)
 Humanity (virtue)
 Ideal (ethics)
 Intellectual virtues
 List of virtues
 Moral character
 Nonviolence
 Prussian virtues
 Nine Noble Virtues (Asatru and Odinism)
 Teachings of the Seven Grandfathers
 Value theory
 Virtue name
 Virtue signalling

References

Further reading

 Newton, John, Ph.D. Complete Conduct Principles for the 21st Century, 2000. .
 James Hankins. 2019. Virtue Politics: Soulcraft and Statecraft in Renaissance Italy. Harvard University Press.
 Hein, David. "Christianity and Honor." The Living Church, August 18, 2013, pp. 8–10.

External links

 The Wikiversity course on virtues
 The Large Clickable List of Virtues at VirtueScience.com
 An overview of Aristotle's ethics, including an explanation and chart of virtues
 Virtue Epistemology
 Virtue, a Buddhist perspective
 Greek Virtue (quotations)
 Peterson & Seligman findings on virtues and strengths (landmark psychological study)
 Illustrated account of the images of the Virtues in the Thomas Jefferson Building, Library of Congress, Washington DC
 The Science of Virtues Project at the University of Chicago
 Roman virtues
 Roman virtues - Roman Republic Cultural Group
 "Virtue", BBC Radio 4 discussion with Galen Strawson, Miranda Fricker and Roger Crisp (In Our Time, Feb. 28, 2002)
 What are Virtues? 

 
Concepts in ethics
Morality
Personality traits
Aristotelianism
Virtue ethics